IFCO may refer to:

 Independent Filmmakers Cooperative of Ottawa,a  co-operative that supports independent filmmakers in Ottawa
 Interreligious Foundation for Community Organization, an international religious and political organization
 Irish Film Classification Office, an organisation responsible for film and some video game classification and censorship within the Republic of Ireland

 IFCO RPC, a type of packaging